Captain Wilfred John Hutton Curwen (14 April 1883 – 9 May 1915) was an English first-class cricketer who played for Oxford University, Surrey and MCC between 1906 and 1910. He was born in Beckenham and died near Poperinghe, Belgium, on active service during World War I.

Curwen was educated at Charterhouse School and Magdalen College, Oxford. At Oxford he was a double blue in cricket and association football. One of the team of amateur MCC cricketers that toured New Zealand in 1906-07, Curwen was described before the tour thus: "Plays all the games, is very popular with the ladies, and dances divinely." He made his highest first-class score in the tour match against Canterbury, when he went to the wicket with the score at 54 for 6 and made a dashing 76 in 77 minutes, taking the total to 200 before he was last out.

Curwen joined the London Regiment as a lieutenant in 1911. He went to Australia, where he served as aide-de-camp to the Governor of Victoria, Sir John Fuller, and two Governors-General of Australia, Baron Denman and Sir Ronald Munro Ferguson. When the First World War began he returned to Great Britain and joined the Royal Fusiliers. He was killed in action in the Second Battle of Ypres.

References

External links

1883 births
1915 deaths
Military personnel from Kent
English cricketers
Surrey cricketers
Oxford University cricketers
Marylebone Cricket Club cricketers
People educated at Charterhouse School
Alumni of Magdalen College, Oxford
Royal Fusiliers officers
British military personnel killed in World War I
British Army personnel of World War I
London Regiment officers